In statistics, the delta method is a result concerning the approximate probability distribution for a function of an asymptotically normal statistical estimator from knowledge of the limiting variance of that estimator.

History 
The delta method was derived from propagation of error, and the idea behind was known in the early 20th century. Its statistical application can be traced as far back as 1928 by T. L. Kelley. A formal description of the method was presented by J. L. Doob in 1935. Robert Dorfman also described a version of it in 1938.

Univariate delta method
While the delta method generalizes easily to a multivariate setting, careful motivation of the technique is more easily demonstrated in univariate terms. Roughly, if there is a sequence of random variables  satisfying
 

where θ and σ2 are finite valued constants and  denotes convergence in distribution, then

for any function g satisfying the property that  exists and is non-zero valued.

Proof in the univariate case
Demonstration of this result is fairly straightforward under the assumption that  is continuous. To begin, we use the mean value theorem (i.e.: the first order approximation of a Taylor series using Taylor's theorem):

where  denotes convergence in probability.

Rearranging the terms and multiplying by  gives

Since

by assumption, it follows immediately from appeal to Slutsky's theorem that

This concludes the proof.

Proof with an explicit order of approximation
Alternatively, one can add one more step at the end, to obtain the order of approximation:

This suggests that the error in the approximation converges to 0 in probability.

Multivariate delta method
By definition, a consistent estimator B converges in probability to its true value β, and often a central limit theorem can be applied to obtain asymptotic normality:

where n is the number of observations and Σ is a (symmetric positive semi-definite) covariance matrix. Suppose we want to estimate the variance of a scalar-valued function h of the estimator B. Keeping only the first two terms of the Taylor series, and using vector notation for the gradient, we can estimate h(B) as

which implies the variance of h(B) is approximately

One can use the mean value theorem (for real-valued functions of many variables) to see that this does not rely on taking first order approximation.

The delta method therefore implies that

or in univariate terms,

Example: the binomial proportion 
Suppose Xn is binomial with parameters  and n.  Since

Hence, even though for any finite n, the variance of  does not actually exist (since Xn can be zero), the asymptotic variance of  does exist and is equal to

This is useful to construct a hypothesis test or to make a confidence interval for the relative risk.

Alternative form
The delta method is often used in a form that is essentially identical to that above, but without the assumption that  or B is asymptotically normal. Often the only context is that the variance is "small". The results then just give approximations to the means and covariances of the transformed quantities. For example, the formulae presented in Klein (1953, p. 258) are:

where  is the rth element of h(B) and Bi is the ith element of B.

Second-order delta method 
When  the delta method cannot be applied. However, if  exists and is not zero, the second-order delta method can be applied.

The second-order delta method is also useful in conducting a more accurate approximation of 's distribution when sample size is small. 
.
For example, when  follows the standard normal distribution,  can be approximated as the weighted sum of a standard normal and a chi-square with degree-of-freedom of 1.

Nonparametric delta method
A version of the delta method exists in nonparametric statistics. Let  be an independent and identically distributed random variable with a sample of size  with an empirical distribution function , and let  be a functional. If  is Hadamard differentiable with respect to the Chebyshev metric, then

where  denotes the -quantile of the standard normal. See Wasserman (2006) p. 19f. for details and examples.

See also
Taylor expansions for the moments of functions of random variables
Variance-stabilizing transformation

References

Further reading

External links

Estimation methods
Statistical approximations
Articles containing proofs
Statistics articles needing expert attention

de:Statistischer Test#Asymptotisches Verhalten des Tests